National Olympic Committee of Mozambique (IOC code: MOZ) is the National Olympic Committee representing Mozambique.

See also
Mozambique at the Olympics
Mozambique at the Commonwealth Games

References

Mozambique
 
1979 establishments in Mozambique